XHKG-FM is a radio station on 107.5 FM in Fortín, Veracruz. It is owned by Radio Cañón and is known as La Dorada.

History
XHKG received its concession on March 14, 1960 as XEKG-AM broadcasting on 820 kHz. It was owned by Radio Fortín, S.A.

It migrated to FM in 2011.

In April 2021, NTR acquired the ABC Radio network from OEM. XHKG was the last station when in adopted the name "Radio Cañón", name used on XEABC-AM and others old ABC Radio stations. Based on XHTGO-FM.

References

Radio stations in Veracruz